A list of  narrow-gauge railways in Germany.

Germany had extensive  installations which were used as a common-carrier railway, industrial, mining, peat, agricultural and hospital railways.

In addition, park and children's railways were constructed.

During both World Wars, extensive military railways were constructed, the so-called trench railways and Heeresfeldbahnen.

Railways

See also
Narrow-gauge railways in Germany